Jose Gonzalez-Gonzalez (December 7, 1922 – December 15, 2000) was a Mexican American character actor and the brother of actor Pedro Gonzalez Gonzalez.

Life and career 
Born Jose Gonzalez-Gonzalez in Guadalajara, Mexico to a Mexican American father and a Mexican born mother with identical surnames, Gonzalez Gonzalez grew up in a talent-filled home. Jose began in show business as part of his family's act called "Las Perlitas" that toured southwest Texas. He made his television debut in 1954 as Jose Gonzales de la Vega on two episodes of The Cisco Kid. In 1962 He played Joze on the S2E28 in the 'Innocents Abroad' episode of My Three Sons  He had a prolific career in both television and motion pictures concluding with his final performance as Mariachi in The Naked Gun 2½: The Smell of Fear (1991).
Jose toured the US as both a singer and comedian his own stage shows, where he appeared at state fairs and conventions such as the Los Angeles County Fair, the Monterey County Fair, The Napa County Fair, and the Sacramento State Fair, as well as Cinco de Mayo celebrations in various locations.

Personal life
After suffering for many years with myeloblastic anemia, he died as a result of a brain hemorrhage brought on by the disease. Jose was survived by his wife of 55 years, Ventura; three daughters Rosalinda, Armandina, Miroslava; seven grandchildren: Jose Nicholas, Joseph Nicholas, Terry Tigner, Tessie Tigner, Miguel Reyes II, Christina Galvan, Armandina Galvan, and one great-grandchild Miguel Reyes III. He was 78 at the time of his death, which occurred on December 15, 2000.

Partial filmography
Strange Lady in Town (1955) - Jose (uncredited)
Hell's Island (1955) - Cock Fight Man (uncredited)
The Fighting Chance (1955) - Jockey (uncredited)
Terror at Midnight (1956) - Delivery Man (uncredited)
 Wetbacks (1956)  - Wetback
 The Three Outlaws (1956) - El Raton
Cha-Cha-Cha Boom! (1956) - Pedro Fernandez
Kronos (1957) - Manuel Ramirez
Panama Sal (1957) - Peon
Showdown at Boot Hill (1958) - Mexican Man with Donkey (uncredited)
The Hangman (1959) - Pedro Alonso
Sex Kittens Go to College (1960) - Mexican (uncredited)
Mermaids of Tiburon (1962) - Pepe Gallardo
For Love or Money (1963) - Jose
From Nashville with Music (1969) - Himself
Moonfire (1970) - Jesus
Herbie Goes Bananas (1980) - Garage Owner
The Naked Gun 2½: The Smell of Fear (1991) - Mariachi (final film role)

References

External links

Obituary

American male film actors
American male television actors
Male Western (genre) film actors
Male actors from Texas
1922 births
2000 deaths
American male actors of Mexican descent
American people of Spanish descent
Burials at Holy Cross Cemetery, Culver City
People from Webb County, Texas
Hispanic and Latino American male actors
20th-century American male actors